Château de Maÿtie, also known as Château d'Andurain is a castle located at 1 rue du Jeu-de-Paume, Mauléon-Licharre, in the Pyrénées-Atlantiques department, Aquitaine region, southwestern France. It is a Renaissance building of the end of the 16th century and has been classified as a historic monuments since 1925.

Architecture

The castle has a rectangular shape, flanked at each corner with a square tower. 
The architecture of Renaissance style, with a particularly striking façade with its elegance: mullioned windows and pediments, arches alleviating lines, masks, carved balcony. The façade as a counterpoint to the massive roof to the frame chestnut shingles, three stories high.

The interior is characterized by a staircase of an elegant openwork arches, serving all floors. The large living room (Salon) on the ground floor, and the room of the bishop, on the 1st floor, include Baroque carved fireplaces, embedding a medallion bearing the arms of the bishop and a portrait of Arnaud de Maytie.

History

The castle was originally built by Arnaud de Maytie who was Catholic Bishop of Oloron between 1599 and 1623.

In 1661, a revolt under the priest Matalas led to the destruction of one of the four towers of the castle, which was never rebuilt. The castle, never sold, is kept in the same family since its construction, the current owners are the Azémar Fabrègues and the castle is open to visitors during the months of July to September.

References

Châteaux in Pyrénées-Atlantiques
Monuments historiques of Nouvelle-Aquitaine